is a Japanese singer, model, and actress. She is a member of Japanese idol group Hinatazaka46, represented by Sony Music Records, as well as a model for the fashion magazine ar.

Career

Music 
Saitō had aspired to become a singer since middle school. She attempted and failed multiple singing auditions until she tried out for Keyakizaka46's subgroup Hiragana Keyakizaka46 after she learned that Yui Imaizumi, whom she had met at one of the previous auditions, was a Keyakizaka46 member. Her musical career began on 11 May 2016 when she passed the auditions, which was hosted on the streaming platform Showroom. Saitō, along with ten other people that passed the audition, joined Neru Nagahama in Hiragana Keyakizaka46 and was known as the "first generation". Her first concert occurred on 28 October of the same year at Akasaka Blitz, where she performed Kanji Keyakizaka46's songs "Silent Majority" and "Sekai ni wa Ai Shika Nai", as well as Hiragana Keyakizaka46's own "Hiragana Keyaki".

During her time at Hiragana Keyakizaka46, she has consistently appeared in every single between "Sekai ni wa Ai Shika Nai" and "Kuroi Hitsuji". She is the center (lead performer) for the song "Soredemo Aruiteru", a B-side for the single "Kaze ni Fukarete mo", and performed solo song in the group's first album Hashiridasu Shunkan, titled . After Hiragana Keyakizaka46 was renamed into Hinatazaka46, Saitō has also appeared in every single to date. She also performed in the song "Hatsukoi Door", a B-side of "Jiwaru Days" performed by Sakamichi AKB, which included members of AKB48 Group and Sakamichi Series.

On May 18, 2022, Saitō performed "Boku Nanka" on the YouTube channel The First Take. It was the first solo performance of a Hinatazaka46 member, and the third one of the group, on the channel. The song was rearranged with piano and strings to showcase her voice, and she commented that she projected her own insecurities into her performance.

On September 10, 2022, during the first performance of Hinatazaka46's nationwide tour "Happy Smile Tour 2022" at Aichi Sky Expo, Hinatazaka46's eighth single "Tsuki to Hoshi ga Odoru Midnight" was announced for release on October 26, 2022, with Saito as the center (lead performer), and the title song was performed live for the first time. It would be the first time in 5 years for Saitō to hold the center position since "Soredemo Aruiteru", first released in 2017, and the first time as the center for a title track.

Modeling 
Saitō is a regular model for the fashion magazine ar, published monthly.

Saitō's solo photobook, titled , was released on January 19, 2021. It was produced by ar magazine's editorial team with the concept of "dating at various locations in Tokyo". The initial print run was 115,000 copies, and a total of 40,000 additional copies were reprinted within its release week. The book placed first in Oricon's photobook sales ranking for its release week with an estimated 84,000 copies sold and was third place with 135,119 copies sold in that year's annual photobook ranking, which saw the top three ranks dominated by Hinatazaka46 with Nao Kosaka's photobook on first and the group's Hinasatsu Vol. 01 on second.

Other ventures 
She is featured in a 2018 television special titled after her catchphrase, in which several members take her to their recommended ramen restaurants. In April 2019, she became an ambassador for the 2019 Ramen Girls Expo in Shizuoka. In February 2021, she was appointed the "Chige Miso Angel" by the ramen chain Hidakaya for her fondness of their Chige Miso ramen.

Saitō is also known for her proficiency in the language game . She often demonstrates this ability in variety shows, with fellow member Kumi Sasaki serving as "interpreter".

In 2019, Saitō played high school student Wakame Isono in the stage adaptation of the manga Sazae-san, which ran from September to October. She shared the role with Nogizaka46 member Manatsu Akimoto.

Saitō has appeared in the Hiragana Keyakizaka46 and Hinatazaka46 television dramas Re:Mind (2017) and Dasada (2020). She also co-starred in the 2021 television drama adaptation of the Tetsuya Honda novel , which features selected members of Nogizaka46, Sakurazaka46, and Hinatazaka46 co-starring in a television drama for the first time.

On April 1, 2021, the late-night dance talk show , co-hosted by Saitō and comedienne , started airing on TV Asahi.

Discography

Songs from Keyakizaka46's singles and albums

Hiragana Keyakizaka46

Albums

Hinatazaka46

Singles

Albums

Videography

Video albums

Sakamichi AKB

Filmography

Television series

Variety show

Bibliography

References

External links 
  

Japanese idols
Hinatazaka46 members
Japanese female models
Musicians from Tokyo
1997 births
Living people
21st-century Japanese women singers
21st-century Japanese singers
Japanese women television presenters